Ky Laffoon (December 23, 1908 – March 17, 1984) was an American professional golfer. (Birthdate also stated as December 24, 1907.) He won 10 times on the PGA Tour, with four of the victories coming in 1934. He played on the 1935 Ryder Cup team. In 1939, his wife Irene threatened to leave him if he could not control his temper on golf course. Next tournament after two rounds he came to 15th hole and his ball was buried in honeysuckle. After missing three shots, he starting shouting cuss words that all the spectators could hear. His wife was one of the spectators and headed for the clubhouse after the outburst. Ky ran after her and pleaded that he wasn't cussing at his golf game, he just hates honeysuckle. He was born in Zinc, Arkansas and died in Springfield, Missouri.

PGA Tour wins (10)
1933 (1) Nebraska Open
1934 (4) Atlanta Open, Hershey Open, Glens Falls Open, Eastern Open Championship
1935 (1) Phoenix Open
1936 (1) Inverness Invitational Four-Ball (with Walter Hagen)
1938 (2) Cleveland Open, Miami International Four-Ball (with Dick Metz)
1946 (1) Montgomery Invitational

Other wins
this list is probably incomplete
1933 Utah Open
1950 Illinois PGA Championship

Results in major championships

Note: Laffoon never played in The Open Championship.

NYF = tournament not yet founded
NT = no tournament
WD = withdrew
DQ = disqualified
CUT = missed the half-way cut
R64, R32, R16, QF, SF = round in which player lost in PGA Championship match play
"T" indicates a tie for a place

Summary

Most consecutive cuts made – 14 (1933 U.S. Open – 1938 Masters)
Longest streak of top-10s – 3 (1935 PGA – 1936 U.S. Open)

See also
List of golfers with most PGA Tour wins

References

American male golfers
PGA Tour golfers
Ryder Cup competitors for the United States
Golfers from Arkansas
People from Boone County, Arkansas
1908 births
1984 deaths